Chandel may refer to:

Places
 Chandel, Manipur, a town in Manipur, India
 Chandel district, a district in Manipur, India

People
 Ashok Kumar Singh Chandel, Indian politician
 Pushpendra Singh Chandel, Indian politician
 Raj Bahadur Singh Chandel, Indian politician
 Suresh Chandel, Indian politician

Other
 Chandel (Rajput clan), a Rajput clan in India

See also
 Chandelas of Jejakabhukti, a dynasty that ruled central India
 Chandelier (disambiguation)
 Chandeleur (disambiguation)